WZLQ (98.5 FM), known as "Z-98.5", is a mainstream rock radio station based in Tupelo, Mississippi, and serves North Mississippi with ERP of 100,000 watts. "Z-98-5" is owned by the Mississippi Radio Group. The station is the former WELO-FM, and was formerly known as "Z-99" in the 1980s. During the decade, it aired an adult contemporary format.

References

External links

ZLQ